Richard Thomas Goldhahn (September 4, 1915 – November 22, 2003), known professionally as Dick Thomas, was an American singing cowboy, songwriter, and musician. He was best known for his 1945 single "Sioux City Sue", a Number One country hit and No. 16 pop hit that year which later became a country music standard and was included in a Gene Autry movie. Thomas was married to the former Maria McGarrigan from 1935 to her death in 1989. They had four sons and two daughters.

Discography

References

External links

 Larry Goldhahn: Dick Thomas Essay & Timeline

1915 births
2003 deaths
American country fiddlers
Singing cowboys
American country singer-songwriters
Singer-songwriters from Pennsylvania
Musicians from Philadelphia
20th-century American singers
Country musicians from Pennsylvania
20th-century American male singers
American male singer-songwriters